was daimyō of Odawara Domain in Sagami Province in early Edo period, Japan. Ōkubo Tadachika was the son of Ōkubo Tadayo, a hereditary vassal to the Tokugawa clan in what is now part of the city of Okazaki, Aichi. He entered into service as a samurai from age 11, and took his first head in battle at the age of 16.

Biography
He served in most of the campaigns of his father, Okubo Tadayo, including the Battle of Anegawa (1570), Battle of Mikatagahara (1573), Battle of Nagashino (1575), Battle of Komaki and Nagakute (1584), and Battle of Odawara (1590). 

He came to be regarded as one of Ieyasu's most experienced and trusted advisors, along with Honda Masanobu. 

In 1593, he was assigned the post of Karō to Tokugawa Hidetada. 

Upon the death of his father in 1594, he became head of the Ōkubo clan, and daimyō of Odawara Domain, whose revenues were raised to 65,000 koku.

In 1600, during the Battle of Sekigahara, his forces accompanied those of Tokugawa Hidetada along the Nakasendō, and were late in arriving at the battle due to resistance by Sanada Masayuki at Ueda Castle in Shinano Province. 

In 1610, after the foundation of the Tokugawa shogunate, he became a rōjū. This was a period of great political intrigue, as Tokugawa Ieyasu had retired to Sunpu, but continued to manipulate politics from behind-the-scenes, much to the growing discontent of Hidedata and his retainers. 

In 1614, Ōkubo Tadachika fell afoul of the shogunate in what was later termed the Ōkubo Nagayasu Incident. His domain was confiscated, and he was reassigned to a small 5,000 koku hatamoto holding in Ōmi Province. Shortly afterwards, he retired from public life, became a Buddhist monk by the name of Keian Dōhaku (渓庵道白).

References
 Japanese Wikipedia article on Tadachika (21 Sept. 2007)

Further reading
Mitsugi Kuniteru 三津木國輝 (1980). Odawara jōshu Ōkubo Tadayo - Tadachika 小田原城主大久保忠世・忠隣. Tokyo: Meichoshuppan 名著出版. (OCLC 62397087)

1553 births
1628 deaths
Daimyo
Edo period Buddhist clergy
People from Okazaki, Aichi
Tadachika
Rōjū